This is a list of electrical generating stations in New Brunswick, Canada.

New Brunswick has a diversified electric supply mix of fuel oil, hydroelectric, nuclear, diesel, coal, natural gas, wind, and biomass power stations. NB Power, the government-owned, integrated public utility is the main power generator in the province. There is a total of 4,346 MW of generation capacity listed here, with 47% of that capacity in the Saint John region in four stations.

Non-Renewable

Fossil fuel 
List of all power stations using fossil fuel in New Brunswick.

Nuclear 
List of all nuclear power stations in New Brunswick.

Renewable

Hydro 
List of all hydroelectric generating stations in New Brunswick.

Other renewables 

List of all wind farms and biomass power plants in New Brunswick.

Notes and references
Notes'''References'''

See also 
 NB Power
 Energy in Canada
 List of power stations in Canada

Lists of power stations in Canada